Streptomyces griseocarneus is a bacterium species from the genus of Streptomyces which has been isolated from soil. Streptomyces griseocarneus produces hydroxystreptomycin, alboverticillin, sphingomyelinase C and rotaventin.

See also 
 List of Streptomyces species

References

Further reading

External links
Type strain of Streptomyces griseocarneus at BacDive – the Bacterial Diversity Metadatabase

griseocarneus
Bacteria described in 1991